Shah-e-Alam is a Bangladesh Awami League politician and the incumbent Member of Parliament of Barisal-2.

Career
Shah-e-Alam was elected to parliament from Barisal-2 as a Bangladesh Awami League candidate 30 December 2018. Alam is also member of the Parliamentary Standing committee for LGED.

References

Awami League politicians
Living people
11th Jatiya Sangsad members
Year of birth missing (living people)